Peter Sohn (born October 18, 1977) is an American animator, voice actor, storyboard artist, and film director. He is known for his work at Pixar Animation Studios as the director of 2015's The Good Dinosaur. He has also been the voice of Emile in Ratatouille, Squishy in Monsters University, and Sox in Lightyear.

Early life
Sohn was raised in New York City, where he was born in The Bronx. His parents were Korean immigrants. 

He graduated from high school in 1995. While attending CalArts, he landed a summer job working on Brad Bird's animated feature film, The Iron Giant.

Career
After graduating from school, he worked at The Walt Disney Company and Warner Bros. before coming to Pixar in the art and story departments for Finding Nemo. He also worked on The Incredibles, Ratatouille and WALL-E. Sohn performed the voice of Remy's brother, Emile in Ratatouille. He made his directorial debut with the short film Partly Cloudy in 2009 which he also wrote. Partly Cloudy was included in the Animation Show of Shows in 2009. Sohn co-directed the English-language version of Ponyo on the Cliff by the Sea in 2009 with John Lasseter and Brad Lewis (fellow Pixar workers).

Russell, the boy in Up, was based on Sohn's appearance. He voiced Russell in the corresponding short, George & A.J., and Squishy in the feature Monsters University.

Sohn directed The Good Dinosaur, which was released in November 2015. He voiced its Styracosaurus character Forrest Woodbush. 

Sohn was set to voice the Marvel Comics character Ganke Lee in the Sony Pictures Animation feature film Spider-Man: Into the Spider-Verse, but his lines were ultimately deleted from the final film.

In 2022, Sohn provided the voice of Sox, a robotic kitten, in the Pixar film Lightyear. That same year, it was announced he was directing Pixar's next original film, Elemental, which was based on his experience growing up in New York. The film will incorporate the classical elements of fire, water, air, and earth as the sentient residents of a city, and is set to release June 16, 2023 as the 27th feature film made by the Emeryville-based studio. In addition, it will be the only Pixar film that year, before they revert back to two for 2024.

Personal life
Sohn is married to artist Anna Chambers, whom he met at CalArts.

Filmography

Feature films

Short films

TV specials

Video games

Other credits

References

External links

American animated film directors
1977 births
Animators from New York (state)
American male screenwriters
American male voice actors
American storyboard artists
American people of Korean descent
California Institute of the Arts alumni
Living people
People from the Bronx
Pixar people
Animation screenwriters
Screenwriters from New York (state)